Temporena whartoni, common name the Holbourne Island banded snail,  is a species of air-breathing land snails, terrestrial pulmonate gastropod mollusks in the family Camaenidae.

This species is endemic to Australia.

References

 Smith, B.J. 1992, "Non-Marine Mollusca", Ed. Houston, W.W.K. (ed.), Zoological Catalogue of Australia. Non-marine Mollusca, vol. 8, Australian Government Publishing Service, Canberra

External links
  Cox, J. C. (1871). Descriptions of seven new species of Australian land shells. Proceedings of the Zoological Society of London. 1871: 53-55
 Stanisic, J. 1996.  Sphaerospira whartoni.
  2006 IUCN Red List of Threatened Species.   Downloaded on 7 August 2007.
  ABRS. (2009). Australian Faunal Directory (AFD). Australian Biological Resources Study, Canberra.

Gastropods of Australia
whartoni
Gastropods described in 1871